Ictericodes zelleri is a species of tephritid or fruit flies in the genus Ictericodes of the family Tephritidae.

Distribution
France, Switzerland, Poland, Czech Republic, Slovakia, Austria, Hungary.

References

Tephritinae
Insects described in 1844
Diptera of Europe